Abu Sayem Chowdhury (born 8 November 1996), known as Abu Sayem, is a Bangladeshi first-class and List A cricketer since the 2014–15 Bangladeshi cricket season and currently (July 2016) is playing for Barishal Division. He was born in Bhola, Bangladesh. He is a right-handed Batsman and a wicket-keeper.

References

External links
 

1996 births
Living people
Bangladeshi cricketers
Barisal Division cricketers
Sheikh Jamal Dhanmondi Club cricketers
People from Bhola District